Rafael Marcelo Delgado (born 13 January 1990) is an Argentine professional footballer who plays as a left-back for Club Atlético Colón.

Career
Delgado began with Rosario Central in 2011. He scored on his professional career debut on 4 April, netting the opening goal in a 3–0 win over Ferro Carril Oeste in Primera B Nacional. In his first three seasons, Delgado scored two goals in fifty-two matches including twenty-eight appearances during 2012–13 which ended with promotion to the Argentine Primera División. He went onto score twice in forty-four games in the top-flight. In January 2015, Delgado joined Estudiantes. He made his debut on 9 March versus San Lorenzo, prior to making three further appearances during the 2015 Argentine Primera División campaign.

On 1 July 2015, seven months after arriving, Delgado departed Estudiantes to sign for Defensa y Justicia. He scored his first goal for Defensa in April 2016 during a 3–1 defeat to Atlético Tucumán. After sixty-six appearances and one goal in his first four seasons with Defensa y Justicia, Delgado left the club on loan in February 2018 to join Categoría Primera A side Atlético Nacional. Fourteen appearances in all competitions later, Delgado returned to Defensa y Justicia and subsequently made his 200th career appearance in the Primera División against Independiente on 24 August.

Career statistics
.

Honours
Rosario Central
Primera B Nacional: 2012–13

References

External links

1990 births
Living people
People from Reconquista, Santa Fe
Argentine footballers
Association football defenders
Argentine expatriate footballers
Primera Nacional players
Argentine Primera División players
Categoría Primera A players
Rosario Central footballers
Estudiantes de La Plata footballers
Defensa y Justicia footballers
Atlético Nacional footballers
Club Atlético Colón footballers
Expatriate footballers in Colombia
Argentine expatriate sportspeople in Colombia
Sportspeople from Santa Fe Province